Cécile De Gernier (born 25 May 1986) is a Belgian football midfielder currently playing for Standard Liège.

Honours 
Standard Liège
Winner
 Belgian Women's First Division (3): 2008–09, 2010–11, 2011–12
 Belgian Women's Cup (2): 2011–12, 2013–14
 BeNe Super Cup (2): 2011–12, 2012–13
 Belgian Women's Super Cup: 2012–13

Runners-up
 BeNe League (2): 2012–13, 2013–14

External links
 
 Belgium national profile  at KBVB / URBSFA
 

1986 births
Living people
Belgian women's footballers
Belgium women's international footballers
Women's association football midfielders
Standard Liège (women) players
BeNe League players
Super League Vrouwenvoetbal players